Brodskyella is a genus of beetles in the family Mordellidae, containing the following species:

 Brodskyella angustata (Píc, 1923)
 Brodskyella holzschuhi Horák, 1989

References

Mordellidae